Anthony Rodriguez may refer to:

 Anthony Rodriguez (judoka) (born 1979), French judoka
 Anthony Rodriguez (politician) (born 1988), member of the Florida House of Representatives